O'Clery is a surname, and may refer to:

 Conor O'Clery, Irish journalist and writer
 Helen O'Clery (1910–2006), Irish writer of children's books
 Keyes O'Clery (1849–1913), Irish barrister and Home Rule politician

See also
 Ó Cléirigh

Surnames of Irish origin